Metro Tasmania, commonly called Metro, a Tasmanian Government business enterprise, is the largest bus operator in the state of Tasmania, Australia, with operations in three of the four largest urban centres of Hobart, and . Urban services in Devonport are provided by a private operator, Merseylink Coaches. Services are provided by Metro under a range of urban and non-urban contracts with the Transport Commission, a division within the Department of State Growth.

History

The history of Metro Tasmania dates back to 1893, when the Hobart Electric Tramway Company (HETCo) was founded by a London consortium. The HETCo was one of the earliest such operators in the world, and was the first electric tramway in the Southern Hemisphere. The company also operated two Dennis motorbuses prior to being taken over in 1913 by the Hobart City Council, who renamed it to Hobart Municipal Tramways (HMT). In 1935, HMT began to use trolleybuses on some networks to replace trams, and petrol buses were introduced on some networks in the 1940s to alleviate congestion.

In 1955, a statutory authority called the Metropolitan Transport Trust (MTT) was formed, and this entity amalgamated the operations of the Hobart Municipal Tramways and Launceston Municipal Transport, which had been operated by the Launceston City Council as Launceston Municipal Tramways between 1911 and 1953 (when 'Tramways' was replaced by 'Transport' following the end of tram services in December 1952). The Hobart Municipal Tramways were taken over by the Trust on 1 March 1955, followed by Launceston on 1 July. At its commencement, the MTT operated trams, trolley, petrol and diesel buses, and was authorised to provide public transport services within a radius of seven miles of the Hobart and Launceston General Post Offices (GPO's).

On 30 August 1959, the MTT acquired the operations of Norton Coaches, which provided bus services in the Burnie area. This resulted in the MTT operating transport services in the South, North and North-West regions of Tasmania. A year later in 1960 saw the closure of the last of Hobart's tram routes, while in 1968 electric traction was removed altogether from Tasmania's streets when the trolleybuses were retired from both Hobart and Launceston.

The MTT began using Metro as its operating name during the late 1980s when the Trust was a division of the Department of Transport. The Metropolitan Transport Trust was dissolved when Metro Tasmania Pty Ltd became a state-owned company in February 1998. Metro Tasmania normally has two shareholders, by law both are ministers in the state government. The Treasurer is one shareholder, while the other holds the Transport portfolio or its equivalent - the current shareholder minister is the Hon. Michael Ferguson MP, who is Deputy Premier, Treasurer and the Minister for Transport and Infrastructure. The government appoints directors to the Board of Metro Tasmania, who in turn appoint the chief executive officer.

In May 1999, Metro purchased Hobart Coaches which operated services to New Norfolk, Richmond, Blackmans Bay and the Channel areas of Hobart. Hobart Coaches was retained as the brand name of the regional division of Metro, initially operating with separate drivers and buses at separate yards, however both the workforce and the fleet were gradually absorbed into the main operation. Services to Kingston and Blackmans Bay became part of Metro's Hobart urban network, with Channel services operated under a separate non-urban contract. In the period since 1999, some of the former Hobart Coaches routes have been relinquished by Metro either for operational reasons, because contracts were sold to other operators, or due to public transport reviews undertaken by the state government. These include New Norfolk (sold to O'Driscoll Coaches), Richmond (sold to Tassielink Transit) and Cygnet (Metro route via Snug withdrawn following government review - Tassielink services via Huonville continue to operate).

As at July 2021, Metro Tasmania employed 504 people statewide. 6.85 million passenger boardings were recorded in the 2020-21 financial year, a decrease of 6.1% on 2019-20 attributed to the impact of COVID-19 on public transport patronage.

Response to the COVID-19 pandemic 
Unlike public transport operations in most other Australian cities, Metro continued to operate its full weekday timetable throughout the 2020-21 pandemic, including periods where lockdowns and travel restrictions were in place. This was possible due to the low number of infections recorded in Tasmania and the effectiveness of measures put in place to minimise the chance of wide-scale outbreaks. To reduce the risk to staff and passengers and provide an opportunity to obtain contactless payment methods, Metro did not collect fares for a period during the winter of 2020 and had passengers board and alight buses from the rear doors to minimise contact with the driver. Increased cleaning and daily sanitising of the fleet was also introduced. Operations had returned to normal by the start of 2021, although the cleaning and sanitising protocols have remained in place. Following the relaxing of domestic travel restrictions in December 2021, COVID began to spread widely throughout the community. This caused extensive disruptions for Metro with drivers either stuck by the virus, isolated as close contacts or needing leave in order to care for sick relatives. Consequently, in the first half of 2022 Metro was forced to cancel substantial volumes of services in both Hobart and Launceston.

Operations

Hobart 
In Hobart, Metro's network extends from Gordon in the southern Channel region, north to Brighton and east to Seven Mile Beach and Opossum Bay with major interchanges in the Hobart, Glenorchy and Rosny Park CBD's and smaller transfer points at Kingston, Howrah Shoreline, Metro Springfield and Bridgewater. Two high-frequency corridors, branded as Turn Up and Go operate between Glenorchy and Hobart via Main Road, New Town Road and Elizabeth Street, and between Howrah Shoreline and Hobart via Clarence Street and Rosny Park. On these corridors a service is scheduled to depart every 10 minutes or better in each direction between 7am and 7pm on weekdays.

Hobart's bus routes are numbered according to their geographical area:

 Routes for destinations south of Hobart City are numbered in the 4-- series.
 Routes for destinations north of Hobart City are numbered in the 5-- series.
 Routes for destinations east of Hobart City are numbered in the 6-- series.
 For express variants of routes, the first digit is replaced with an X.
 School bus routes on the western side of the River Derwent are numbered in the 2-- series, and on the east in the 3-- series. For morning services the third digit is odd, in the afternoon it is even.

Cross-town routes that either bypass Hobart City or travel through the CBD without terminating are Routes 500 (Glenorchy - Hobart - Southern Outlet - Blackmans Bay), 501 (Glenorchy - Hobart - University), 601 (Howrah Shoreline - Rosny Park - Hobart - University), 605 (Howrah Shoreline - Rosny Park - Glenorchy), 694 (Rosny Park - Risdon Vale - Glenorchy) and 696 (Rosny Park - Risdon Vale - Otago/Old Beach - Bridgewater).

Some evening and weekend services on the Glenorchy - Hobart Turn Up and Go corridor are operated to/from New Norfolk as Route 722 by O'Driscolls Coaches as part of a Tasmanian Government project aimed at increasing the integration between urban and non-urban services. Since January 2019, non-urban and urban fringe services operated by private companies (O'Driscolls, Tasmanian Redline Coaches and Tassielink Transit) from destinations such as the Huon Valley, Sorell, Richmond and New Norfolk have been permitted to pick up and set down passengers travelling wholly within the Hobart urban area.

Launceston 
In Launceston, the Metro network is bounded by the suburbs of Youngtown, St Leonards, Waverley, Rocherlea, North Riverside, Blackstone Heights and Hadspen. The major interchange is located in St John Street in the Launceston CBD. Two high-frequency Turn Up and Go corridors are operated. The first is between the University, Mowbray and the City via Invermay Road, and the second is between the City and Kings Meadows via the Launceston General Hospital, Wellington St and Hobart Rd.

A new public transport network for Launceston and surrounding regions was introduced on 19 January 2020. This review formed part of the Department of State Growth's program of integrating urban and non-urban bus services, and included both Metro and private operators including Manions Coaches, Tassielink Transit, East Tamar Bus Lines and Saintys North-East Bus Service. Private operators are now permitted to pick up and set down passengers travelling wholly within the Launceston urban area. As part of a process of reducing duplication of routes and services, Metro withdrew most of its services to North Riverside via West Tamar Rd and was replaced by Manions Coaches which now includes North Riverside as part of its Legana route.

Launceston's routes were re-numbered as part of the review in order to fit into a statewide route numbering system developed by State Growth in conjunction with Metro. The route numbers generally form a pattern according to their geographical area

 Northern Suburbs: Rocherlea, Alanvale, Mayfield, Mowbray, University (Routes 110, 115, 116, 117)
 Eastern Suburbs: Ravenswood, Waverley, St Leonards (Routes 120, 121, 122, 130, 131)
 Southern & Central: South Launceston, East Launceston, Punchbowl, Newstead, Norwood, Youngtown, Kings Meadows (Routes 110, 140, 141, 142, 145, 146, 147)
 Riverside & Trevallyn: (Routes 150, 151, 152)
 Via Westbury Rd: Hadspen, Casino, Blackstone Heights, Prospect (Routes 160, 161, 162)
 Via West Launceston: Prospect Vale, Summerhill (Routes 165, 167)
 School buses are numbered in the 800 series but do not follow a geographical pattern.

Metro also operates the Tiger Bus service under contract to the Launceston City Council. In the morning and afternoon peaks a commuter shuttle links the CBD with the Inveresk Park & Ride car park, while during the inter-peak period the bus alternates between three tourist-oriented routes known as the City Explorer, River Explorer and Gorge Explorer.

Burnie 
In Burnie, Metro operates within the urban area from Chasm Creek in the east to Somerset in the west, and within suburban Burnie as far south as Shorewell Park, Downlands, Havenview and Emu Heights. Non-urban services are provided westward to Wynyard, and eastwards to Penguin and Ulverstone. A new network of services developed by the Department of State Growth for Burnie, Devonport and the north-west coast was implemented on 17 January 2021, and introduced Sunday services for the first time to these centres. The Burnie general access routes are numbered as follows:

 Route 190: Burnie City to Ulverstone via Penguin, Wivenhoe & South Burnie
Route 191: Burnie City to Emu Heights via Havenview, Three Mile Line, Shorewell Park, Acton (Thorne St) & Upper Burnie
Route 192: Burnie City > Upper Burnie > Acton > Montello > West Park Grove > Burnie City Circular
Route 193: Burnie City > West Park Grove > Montello > Acton > Upper Burnie > Burnie City Circular
Route 194: Burnie City > Upper Burnie > Acton (Thorne St) > Shorewell Plaza > Mooreville Rd > Brickport Rd > Hospital > Park Grove > Burnie City Circular
Route 195: Burnie City > Park Grove > Hospital > Brickport Rd > Mooreville Rd > Shorewell Plaza > Acton (Thorne St) > Upper Burnie > Burnie City Circular
Route 196: Burnie City to Brooklyn via Romaine, Upper Burnie & Hillcrest
Route 197: Burnie City to Wynyard via Somerset
 School buses are numbered in the 800 series.
Routes 194 & 195 combine to provide a half hour frequency on weekdays on the main suburban loop in Burnie, while Route 197 operates hourly to and from Wynyard. Other routes operate on a lower frequency.

The main hub for Burnie services is the interchange, located in the CBD. Passengers can transfer between Metro services, or access other services including:

 Route 708: North-West Express between Burnie & Devonport (operated by Merseylink Coaches)
 Route 747: Burnie to Zeehan, Queenstown & Strahan (operated by Tassielink Transit)
 Route 768: Burnie to Smithton via Stanley (operated by Redline Coaches)

Route 708 connects passengers from the western end of the north-west coast to intrastate coaches to Launceston and Hobart which start and end at the Devonport interchange.

Ticketing
Metro currently uses a smartcard ticketing system known as Greencard, alongside paper receipt-style tickets which are only purchasable with cash on the bus.

Historically, Metro used paper tickets from its foundation until 1987, when a new magnetic-striped system by Crouzet was introduced in Hobart and Launceston, known initially as Metrofare. This system allowed for easier transfers across the network and an exact fare expiration time of 90 minutes. Upon the ending of this system, all ticketing equipment was sold to Adelaide Metro, who are the last remaining company using the system. Due to its smaller network and patronage, Burnie retained paper tickets and did not use Metrofare.

It was not until 2008 when a new system by INIT GmbH began trials, using an electronic card to validate and purchase tickets. The Greencard system was introduced statewide during 2010, and allows for passengers to deposit a desired amount onto their cards, with the balance debited upon each trip. The Greencard system also requires validation on each boarding, and has a fare expiration of 90 minutes from the initial boarding. Unlike many other jurisdictions with electronic ticketing, passengers do not tag off at the end of their journey. Each bus has a single Greencard reader and ticket sales point, which is operated by the driver.

Fare types include Adult, Concession/Student and Child, and each are divided into Metro's system of zones based on the distance from the Hobart, Launceston and Burnie CBD's. Fares for non-urban areas such as the Channel, South Arm-Opossum Bay, Wynyard and Ulverstone are set by the Transport Commission.

Current Fleet
As at November 2022, Metro had a statewide fleet of 231 buses, consisting of:

 5 Scania N-series Orana rigid buses. All are located in Hobart at the Springfield Depot. Fleet numbers are #639, #640, #648, #658 & #659.
 86 Scania 12.5m low-floor buses. Buses with Northcoast bodies are numbered #204 to 245. Buses with Custom Coaches CB60 bodies are numbered #300 to 336, CB80 bodies are numbered #337 to 344.
 15 Scania low-floor articulated buses with Custom Coaches bodies. Buses #723-726 have CB60 bodies, while #727-730 and #736-742 have CB80 bodies.
 2 Scania 14.5m low-floor buses. All are located in Hobart and carry fleet numbers #202-203. 
 5 MAN A24 low-floor articulated buses with King Long bodies (purchased second-hand from Skybus in Melbourne). These carry fleet numbers #731-735.
 11 Scania 11.9m low-floor buses (acquired from Melbourne Airport Ltd), numbered #400-410.
 107 Bustech 12.5m XDi low-floor buses, numbered #800 to 906.

100 Bustech XDi 12.5m low-floor buses with Cummins engines have been introduced to the Metro fleet between 2018 and 2021, with the prototype constructed at the Bustech factory in Brisbane and the remaining 99 being built locally in partnership with Tasmanian company Elphinstone Pty Ltd at their factory in Wynyard. These are numbered #800-899. An additional tranche of 26 buses was ordered in December 2020, with deliveries commencing in November 2021. These buses will be numbered in the #900 series. Hobart services are scheduled to be operated entirely by the wheelchair-accessible fleet, however the five remaining Scania Oranas are still used as operational spares.

The Launceston fleet became 100% low-floor with the introduction of new timetables on 19 January 2020, the first Metro operating area to do so. Burnie became 100% low-floor at the end of January 2020. Hobart services are scheduled to be operated entirely by the wheelchair-accessible fleet, however the five remaining Scania Oranas are still used as operational spares.

The Burnie fleet (14 units) consists of three Scania Northcoast buses, eight Scania 11.9m buses (ex-Melbourne Airport) and three Bustech XDi buses. The Launceston fleet (49 units) consists of 29 Scania 12.5m buses (a mix of Northcoast and Custom Coaches CB60 units), and 20 Bustech XDi buses. The Hobart fleet consists of all 19 articulated buses, three 11.9m buses, 53 Scania 12.5m (Northcoast, CB60 & CB80), 83 Bustech XDi and 5 Scania Oranas. All 223 buses in the fleet are fitted with CCTV systems, and over 90% have air conditioning.

Historical Fleet 

 The Hobart Electric Tramway Company commenced in 1893 with 20 double-deck trams constructed by Siemens. The company and its successor Hobart Municipal Tramways went on to construct their own rolling stock, and the fleet reached its peak size in 1946 with 76 units in service.  Launceston's Municipal Tramways commenced in 1911 with a fleet of 14 single-deck trams, with the eventual fleet comprising 29 units.
 The first trolleybus was introduced to Hobart in 1935, and over 50 units were in the fleet at its peak in the 1950s. Launceston's trolleybuses began operation in 1951, with the peak fleet of 30 being reached in 1953. The MTT transferred five units from Launceston to Hobart in 1964.
 A range of vehicles have served the MTT and Metro, including (but not limited to) AEC Regals, Leyland 1/2 cabs, OB & SB Bedfords, AEC Reliances, Volvo B58s, Volvo B10Ms, Leyland Nationals and Hino BT51s. The most recently retired fleet has been the Scania 14.5m buses and the Scania rigids constructed by the former Ansair factory at Kingston.

Preserved buses
Several vehicles once operated by the MTT and Metro have now been preserved by the Tasmanian Transport Museum and the Tasmanian Bus & Coach Society. These include:
1942 Canton trolleybus #74 - Donated by MTT in 1964 to Tasmanian Transport Museum, in full operating condition.
1948 AEC Regal #16 - Acquired in 1976 by Tasmanian Transport Museum, unrestored.
1953 BUT trolleybus #235 - Donated by MTT in 1968 to Tasmanian Transport Museum, last trolleybus to operate in Tasmania
1971 Bedford SB3 #249 - Donated by Metro to Tasmanian Transport Museum in 1988, in full operating condition. The last bus built by City Bodyworks Moonah
1975 Leyland National #601 - Donated by Metro to Tasmanian Transport Museum in 1992.
1980 Volvo B58 #747 - Preserved By Private Owner, being restored to original livery. First articulated bus in full service in Tasmania. Delivered as fleet number 747 (the original MTT articulated buses carried fleet numbers related to Boeing jets to signify their special status), it spent most of its time in the MTT/Metro fleet re-numbered as 702.
1989 Scania N113CRB #134 - Donated by Metro to Tasmanian Bus & Coach Society in 2010, in full operational condition. Minor restoration ongoing.
1985 Volvo B10ML articulated bus - Donated by Metro to Tasmanian Bus & Coach Society in April 2016, in full operational condition. When donated, was the oldest bus in Government service in Australia. Currently being restored to original livery
1991 MAN 10.180HOCL "Busy Bee" midibus - Preserved by private owner. Restoration ongoing
1992 Scania N113CRB prototype Low Floor #200 - Purchased by Tasmanian Bus & Coach Society in March 2017, courtesy sponsorship from Scania Australia. Full restoration complete.

Livery
The initial bus livery adopted in 1955 was the same larch green and cream carried by trams and trolleybuses. In the late 1970s a new livery of rolled gold and cream appeared, which was updated in the early 1980s with a red band below the window line and a stylised MTT logo replacing the traditional monogram. The delivery of the first buses constructed at the new Ansair factory at Kingston during 1987 coincided with a re-branding of the Trust. Although still known as the Metropolitan Transport Trust, the business began to use the name Metro in its daily operations. The new buses were rolled out in a two-tone green livery with Metro titles replacing the stylised MTT logo - at the time the buses operating in the green livery indicated that the vehicle had a passenger-operated rear door. The existing fleet retained the gold and cream through to their retirements, with the exception of the articulated buses which were gradually repainted during the 1990s.

In the early 1990s, new Metro eXpress (MX) services were introduced, and a number of Scania N112 buses and Volvo articulateds were given a livery of green and yellow on white and special MX titles. Newly-delivered Scania N113 Oranas commencing with fleet number 606 carried a modified version of this livery. The green and yellow scheme will disappear with the withdrawal of the last Scania Orana rigid buses, having been replaced since 2010 by a corporate white, with all buses sporting a yellow front to aid with visibility.

Buses have periodically being painted into special liveries. One of the most notable liveries was for the Busy Bee, a high-frequency service that operated for a period from the mid-1990s on the Sandy Bay & University loop in Hobart and to Invermay and Mowbray in Launceston. A number of MAN 10.180 midibuses were painted bright yellow and adorned with a cartoon bee alongside destinations that the buses travelled to. The success of the Sandy Bay service resulted in buses larger than the 30-seat midibuses being required at peak times, and a single Scania Orana was also painted in the livery.

Depots
Metro maintains three large-sized depots, one each in Hobart (Derwent Park), Launceston and Burnie. These depots house Metro's buses and managerial operations, with Hobart being the central office. Each depot contains refuelling and workshop services.

The original headquarters for the MTT were in central Hobart, with the Depot in Campbell St. Much of the historical facade still exists today on the corner of Campbell and Macquarie Streets, opposite City Hall. Part of the depot was closed between 1985 and 1987 to allow for the construction of the Sheraton Hotel (now the Hotel Grand Chancellor), and coincided with the opening of the MTT's Springfield Interchange which replaced this lost capacity and also included workshops.

Following the Tasman Bridge disaster in January 1975, the MTT was dramatically impacted as it did not have any depot facilities on the eastern side of the Derwent River. A temporary depot was established at Bellerive Oval while work proceeded to construct a new facility at Mornington. This included workshops and driver amenities to enable the MTT's Eastern Shore services to operate independently from the City Depot while the Tasman Bridge was being rebuilt. The Mornington Depot remained an important part of the MTT's operations following the re-opening of the Tasman Bridge in 1977, however its usage gradually decreased as operations began to be centralised at Springfield during the 1980s and 1990s. A small compound was retained for some years for use as a satellite yard before being vacated entirely.

Satellite Yards
Because of the widespread nature of their services, Metro also have various satellite yards located in non-urban and outer suburban areas. These yards allow buses to begin their daily services in specific places, and can allow for greater early morning frequency for some routes and reduce the need to run buses out of service. The yards have minimal facilities and exist so as buses can be stored overnight, ready to begin an inward service the next day.

Hobart 

MorningtonThe former depot has been replaced by a satellite compound adjacent to the Mornington Waste Transfer Station.
Bridgewater/BrightonBuses used for services for Bridgewater and the northern suburbs are stabled here overnight. Due to its larger size, buses that have been withdrawn from use and are awaiting disposal are also stored at Bridgewater.
KingstonBuses from this yard serve Kingston, Blackmans Bay and some Channel destinations in the morning peak hour.
LauderdaleServing Lauderdale and South Arm in the morning peak.
Woodbridge - Small facility with 3 to operate peak direction services.
Whitewater - An additional yard opened in early 2022 to augment Kingston Yard, which has reached capacity.

Burnie 

 WynyardTwo buses are stored overnight.
 UlverstoneOne bus is stored overnight.

See also

Trolleybuses in Hobart
Trolleybuses in Launceston, Tasmania

References

External links
Company website

Bus companies of Tasmania
Transport in Tasmania
1955 establishments in Australia
Government-owned companies of Tasmania
Companies based in Hobart